Idhaya Malar is a 1976 Indian Tamil-language romantic drama film directed by Gemini Ganesan and Thamarai Manaalan. It is based on the novel Ninaivugal Nilaikkatum, written by Maniyan. The film stars Sujatha, Gemini Ganesan and Kamal Haasan. It was released on 3 September 1976.

Plot

Krishnan, an elderly person with his wife Rajam are childless and bring up Radha, who is Krishnan's sister as their daughter. Mohan, a tennis player, falls in love with Radha. Krishnan accepts to their proposal to marry but Rajam avoids the marriage by revealing a bitter truth to Radha. Radha had married Sridhar at the age of five. She avoids Mohan who is actually the brother of Sridhar. She goes in search of Sridhar but finds out he is married . She returns home and avoids her family and lives alone. Mohan's neighbour is very possessive about him and also has a crush on him. The film ends with Mohan marrying his neighbour and Radha sacrificing her love.

Cast 
Gemini Ganesan as Krishnan
Sowcar Janaki as Rajam
Sujatha as Radha
Kamal Haasan as Mohan
Vijaya Kumar as Sreedhar
K. A. Thangavelu as Singaram
M. Saroja as Kumari

Production 
Idhaya Malar is the directorial debut of Gemini Ganesan, and the only film he directed in his life. After directing some scenes, he left due to differences with the producer, resulting in Thamarai Manaalan taking over. However, both men retained director's credit. This film was shot in black-and-white. It was given a "U" (Unrestricted) certificate by the Central Board of Film Certification after three cuts.

Soundtrack 
Soundtrack was composed by M. S. Viswanathan. All lyrics written by Pulamaipithan.

Reception 
A critic from Kalki appreciated the film for the performances of most of the cast.

References

External links 
 

1970s Tamil-language films
1976 films
1976 romantic drama films
Films based on Indian novels
Films scored by M. S. Viswanathan
Indian black-and-white films
Indian romantic drama films